Bronisław Trzebunia (born 15 September 1941) is a Polish alpine skier. He competed in three events at the 1964 Winter Olympics.

References

1941 births
Living people
Polish male alpine skiers
Olympic alpine skiers of Poland
Alpine skiers at the 1964 Winter Olympics
Sportspeople from Zakopane
20th-century Polish people